A frequency band is an interval in the frequency domain, delimited by a lower frequency and an upper frequency. The term may refer to a radio band or an interval of some other spectrum. 

The frequency range of a system is the range over which it is considered to provide satisfactory performance, such as a useful level of signal with acceptable distortion characteristics. A listing of the upper and lower limits of frequency limits for a system is not useful without a criterion for what the range represents.

Many systems are characterized by the range of frequencies to which they respond. Musical instruments produce different ranges of notes within the hearing range. The electromagnetic spectrum can be divided into many different ranges such as visible light, infrared or ultraviolet radiation, radio waves, X-rays and so on, and each of these ranges can in turn be divided into smaller ranges. A radio communications signal must occupy a range of frequencies carrying most of its energy, called its bandwidth. A frequency band may represent one communication channel or be subdivided into many. Allocation of radio frequency ranges to different uses is a major function of radio spectrum allocation.

See also

References

Signal processing
Telecommunication theory